Jurica Golemac (born May 29, 1977) is a Slovenian professional basketball coach and former player. He played at both the forward and center positions.

Professional career
In his professional career, Golemac played for Zrinjevac, Union Olimpija, Geoplin Slovan, Efes Pilsen, Cibona, Ural Great, Hapoel Jerusalem, Paris-Levallois, Panellinios, Virtus Roma, Panathinaikos, Zadar, Colossus Rhodes, Alba Berlin, Sidigas Avellino and Krka. He retired from professional basketball in January 2013 after knee injury.

Internationally, Golemac played for the Slovenia national team and represented the country at the 2003, 2005 and 2009 editions of EuroBasket.

Coaching career
Golemac started his coaching career as an assistant coach to Slaven Rimac at Cibona, in November 2013. The surprising victory at the 2013–14 ABA League final four in Belgrade was followed by a string of bad results which resulted in Rimac and Golemac being sacked in December 2015.

In 2016, Golemac was appointed the assistant coach of the Georgia national team and the head coach of Tajfun Šentjur of the Slovenian League.

In May 2017, Golemac was named the head coach of Koper Primorska. In his inaugural season with the club, Primorska won first trophies in its history, including the Slovenian Cup and Supercup. In 2019, Primorska managed to win the ABA League Second Division, being consequently promoted to the First Division. Besides this success, the club also won the first domestic league title, and the second domestic cup in the history. On 20 December 2019, Golemac resigned from Koper Primorska.

On January 27, 2020, Golemac was appointed the head coach of the Slovenian club Cedevita Olimpija, following the departure of his former colleague Slaven Rimac.

References

External links

 ABA League profile
 TBLStat.net profile

1977 births
Living people
Basketball players from Zagreb
Alba Berlin players
Anadolu Efes S.K. players
Centers (basketball)
Greek Basket League players
Hapoel Jerusalem B.C. players
Israeli Basketball Premier League players
KK Cedevita Olimpija coaches
KK Cibona players
KK Krka players
KK Koper Primorska coaches
KK Olimpija players
KK Zadar players
KK Zrinjevac players
Kolossos Rodou B.C. players
Pallacanestro Virtus Roma players
Panellinios B.C. players
Metropolitans 92 players
PBC Ural Great players
Power forwards (basketball)
Slovenian expatriate basketball people in France
Slovenian expatriate basketball people in Germany
Slovenian expatriate basketball people in Greece
Slovenian expatriate basketball people in Italy
Slovenian expatriate basketball people in Turkey
Slovenian expatriate basketball people in Israel
Croatian expatriate basketball people in France
Croatian expatriate basketball people in Germany
Croatian expatriate basketball people in Greece
Croatian expatriate basketball people in Italy
Croatian expatriate basketball people in Turkey
Croatian expatriate basketball people in Israel
Slovenian men's basketball players
Small forwards

Slovenian people of Croatian descent